The 2018 All-Ireland Senior Football Championship was the 131st edition of the GAA's premier inter-county Gaelic football competition since its establishment in 1887.

Thirty-three teams entered the competition – thirty-one of the thirty-two counties of Ireland (Kilkenny, as in previous years, did not enter), London and New York.

Competition format
Provincial Championships format

Connacht, Leinster, Munster and Ulster each organise a provincial championship. All provincial matches are knock-out but the teams who lose a match (with the exception of New York) enter the All-Ireland qualifiers.

Qualifiers format

Twenty-eight of the twenty-nine teams who were beaten in the provincial championships enter the All-Ireland qualifiers, which have a single-game knockout format. Sixteen of the seventeen teams (New York do not enter the qualifiers) who lost in provincial first round or quarter-final games play eight matches in round 1. The winners play the eight losing provincial semi-finalists in round 2. The eight winning teams from round 2 play-off against each other in round 3, with the four winning teams facing the four losing provincial finalists in round 4 to complete the double-elimination format. Further details of the format are included with each qualifier round listed below.

All-Ireland format

Significant changes to the format of the All-Ireland championship were passed at the GAA's Annual Congress in February 2017 and implemented in the 2018 championship. The major change was the creation of the All-Ireland Quarter-Final Group Stage commonly known as the "Super 8s", which replaced the knockout quarter-finals. The eight remaining teams in the Championship are split into two groups of four teams. One group features the Connacht champions, Munster champions, Leinster runners-up (or the team that defeats them in the qualifiers) and Ulster runners-up (or the team that defeats them in the qualifiers). The reverse is employed for the other group, which features the Leinster champions, Ulster champions, Connacht runners-up (or the team that defeats them in the qualifiers) and Munster runners-up (or team that defeats them in the qualifiers).

The top two teams in each of the two Super 8 groups advance to the semi-finals, with the winners of those matches meeting in the All-Ireland Senior Football Championship Final. The All-Ireland final was initially scheduled for 26 August 2018 but was moved to 2 September 2018 to avoid clashing with Pope Francis's visit to Ireland.

A number of former players have publicly criticised the new format as they believed it would result in the same top county teams regularly playing at least three high-profile matches in July and August while the remaining teams are without competitive football until the end of December, thereby enabling the top teams to become even more elite. Prominent sportswriter and RTÉ Sport analyst Joe Brolly referred to the new system as the "Super 8/Crap 25". The changes were to be trialled for three years before being reviewed by the GAA in late 2020.

Changes from 2017 Championship

Rules
 From 1 January 2018 the kickout must travel beyond the 20 metre line. Previously the players had to be outside the 20 metre line before the kickout was taken but could run inside to collect possession. If the rule is broken by the team taking the kickout the referee throws the ball up on the 20 metre line between a member of each team.
 Replays to only be held for drawn provincial finals and All-Ireland finals. The game continues until a winner is determined in all other championship matches except the Super 8 group matches. Initially two periods of ten minutes each way are played. If the score is still level two further periods of five minutes each way are played. If the score is still level, a free-taking competition is held until a winner is determined.
 The A and B split system for the qualifier draws introduced in 2014 was discontinued.

Referees' interpretation
 Players who enter a situation involving two players and cause a melee to receive red cards. Willie Barret, Referees Development Chairman, said "We would be particularly honing in on the first and second person into the melee after the initial two players have been involved."

Provincial championships

Connacht Championship

Leinster Championship

The four winning teams in the previous year's quarter-finals were given byes to this year's quarter-finals. Six of the seven remaining teams played off in the first round with the seventh team receiving a bye to the quarter-finals.

Munster Championship

The two winning teams in the previous year's semi-finals were given byes to this year's semi-finals.

Ulster Championship

All nine teams were drawn randomly without conditions to determine the fixtures.

All-Ireland Series

Qualifiers

Format
The A and B split system for the qualifier draws introduced in 2014 was discontinued after 2017. In qualifier rounds one to three, teams from divisions three and four of the 2018 National Football League had home advantage if drawn against teams from divisions one or two. All qualifier matches were knockout.

Initial schedule

Qualifiers Round 1: 9 June 2018
Qualifiers Round 2: 23 June 2018
Qualifiers Round 3: 30 June 2018
Qualifiers Round 4: 7 & 8 July 2018

Round 1
In the first round, sixteen of the seventeen teams who were beaten in the preliminary rounds or quarter-finals of the provincial championships competed. New York did not enter the qualifiers. The round 1 draw was unrestricted − if two teams had previously met in a provincial match they could be drawn to meet again. The eight winners of these matches played the eight losing provincial semi-finalists in round 2 of the qualifiers. The draw was conducted on 28 May 2018.

The following teams took part in round 1:

 
  London
  Mayo

 
  Kildare
  Louth
  Meath
  Offaly
  Westmeath
  Wexford
  Wicklow

 
  Limerick
  Waterford

 
  Antrim
  Armagh
  Cavan
  Derry
  Tyrone

Round 2
In the second round, the eight losing provincial semi-finalists played the eight winning teams from round 1 of the qualifiers. The round 2 draw was unrestricted − if two teams have previously met in a provincial match they could be drawn to meet again. The eight winners of these matches played each other in round 3. The draw was conducted on 11 June 2018.

The following teams took part in round 2 –

  Carlow
  Clare
  Down
  Leitrim
  Longford
  Monaghan
  Sligo
  Tipperary

  Armagh
  Cavan
  Kildare
  Louth
  Mayo
  Offaly
  Tyrone
  Waterford

Round 3

In the third round, the eight winning teams from round 2 played off in four matches. Round 3 draw rules did not allow two teams that had played each other in a provincial match to meet again if such a pairing could be avoided. The four winners of these matches played the four losing provincial finalists in round 4. The draw was conducted on 25 June 2018.

The following teams took part in round 3 –

  Armagh
  Cavan
  Kildare
  Leitrim
  Mayo
  Monaghan
  Tyrone
  Clare

 Initially the Central Competitions Control Committee scheduled the Cavan vs. Tyrone and Kildare vs. Mayo matches in Croke Park. The venues were changed after Kildare refused to play anywhere other than their home ground, St Conleth's Park, in Newbridge.

Round 4
In the fourth round, the four losing provincial finalists played the four winning teams from round 3 of the qualifiers. Round 4 draw rules did not allow teams that have met in a provincial match to meet again if such a pairing could be avoided, which meant Fermanagh were kept apart from Armagh and Monaghan, who they had met in the quarter-finals and semi-finals of the Ulster Championship respectively. The matches are normally held in neutral venues. The four winners of these matches qualified for the All-Ireland Quarter-Final Group Stage. The draw was conducted on 2 July 2018.

The following teams took part in round 4 –

  Cork
  Fermanagh
  Laois
  Roscommon

  Armagh
  Kildare
  Monaghan
  Tyrone

Group stage

Super 8s
Format

The four provincial champions and the four winning teams from round four of the All-Ireland qualifiers play three games each in two groups of four teams during the months of July and August. Each group consists of two provincial champions and the two losing finalists of the other two provinces or the team that beats them in round four of the qualifiers.

In the first round (officially phase one) the two provincial champions play each other and the two round four qualifiers play each other in Croke Park. In rounds two and three (phases two and three) the provincial champions play the two qualifiers. In phase two the qualifiers have home advantage and the provincial winners are at home in phase three. Dublin, if they qualify, to also play their home game at Croke Park.

Two points are awarded for a win and one point for a draw. The top two teams in each group advance to the All-Ireland semi-finals.

Tie-breaker

If only two teams are level on group points –
 The team that won the head-to-head match is ranked first
 If this game was a draw, score difference (total scored minus total conceded in all group games) is used to rank the teams
 If score difference is identical, total scored is used to rank the teams
 If still identical, a play-off is required
If three or more teams are level on group points, score difference is used to rank the teams.

Group 1

Group 2

Knockout stage

Bracket

Semi-finals
The winner of Group 1 played the runner-up of Group 2, while the winner of Group 2 played the runner-up of Group 1.

Final

The final was initially planned for 26 August 2018. It was rescheduled to 2 September to avoid a clash with the visit of Pope Francis to Ireland for the World Meeting of Families 2018.

Stadia and locations
Each team has a nominal home stadium, though not all teams are guaranteed a home game over the course of the Championship. In addition, games may be played at neutral or alternate venues. For example, Dublin have not played a Championship game in Parnell Park, their nominal home, since the 2004 Championship.

Championship statistics
All scores correct as of 4 September 2018

Top scorer: overall

Top scorer: from play
As of 4 September 2018

Top scorer: single game

Scoring events
Widest winning margin: 27 points
 Waterford 0-09 – 5–21 Monaghan (Qualifiers)
Most goals in a match: 8
Limerick 3-07 – 5–19 Mayo (Qualifiers)
Most points in a match: 45
London 1–19 – 2–26 Louth (Qualifiers)
Most goals by one team in a match: 5
Waterford 0-09 – 5–21 Monaghan (Qualifiers)
Limerick 3-07 – 5–19 Mayo (Qualifiers)
 Highest aggregate score: 58 points
Dublin 4–24 – 2–16 Roscommon (Super 8s)
Lowest aggregate score: 19 points
Fermanagh 0–12 – 0-07 Armagh (Ulster SFC)

Miscellaneous
 Fermanagh beat Armagh  in the Ulster championship for the first time since 1966.
 Carlow beat Kildare in the Leinster championship for the first time since 1953. 
 Longford beat Meath in the Leinster championship for the first time since 1982.
 Dublin played Wicklow in the Leinster championship for the first time since 1990.
 Galway beat Kerry in the All-Ireland championship for the first time since 1965.
Galway reached the All-Ireland semi-final for the first time since 2001.
Monaghan reached the All-Ireland semi-final for the first time since 1988.
 There were first time meetings in the championship for:
 Waterford vs Wexford
 London vs Louth
 Offaly vs Antrim
 Waterford vs Monaghan
 Carlow vs Tyrone
 Leitrim vs Monaghan
 Armagh vs Clare
 Kerry won a 6th Munster title in a row for the first time since 8 in a row (1975–1982).
 The All Ireland semi-final between Dublin vs Galway was their first championship meeting since the All Ireland final 1983.
 Dublin won a record 8 Leinster titles in a row and are 4 time All-Ireland champions in a row, 100 years on from Wexford and the Kerry teams from (1929–1932) and (1978–1981).
 Dublin and Jim Gavin extend their record breaking unbeaten streak to 28 championship games in a row.
 Tyrone lost 3 Championship matches in one season making them the first team in history to do so.

Referees Panel
As announced in April 2018:
 Ciaran Branagan (Down)
 Barry Cassidy (Derry)
 David Coldrick (Meath)
 Niall Cullen (Fermanagh)
 Maurice Deegan (Laois)
 David Gough (Meath)
 Jerome Henry (Mayo)
 Pádraig Hughes (Armagh)
 Sean Hurson (Tyrone)
 Fergal Kelly (Longford)
 Conor Lane (Cork)
 Martin McNally (Monaghan), first year
 Joe McQuillan (Cavan)
 Noel Mooney (Cavan)
 Paddy Neilan (Roscommon)
 Anthony Nolan (Wicklow)
 Derek O'Mahoney (Tipperary)
 Cormac Reilly (Meath)

Marty Duffy (Sligo) retired at the end of 2017 and Rory Hickey (Clare) was ruled out for 2018 due to injury.

Linesman Panel
 James Bermingham (Cork)
 Brendan Cawley (Kildare)
 Liam Devenney (Mayo)
 Paul Faloon (Down)
 Sean Lonergan (Tipperary)
 James Molloy (Galway)
 Padraig O'Sullivan (Kerry)
 Barry Tiernan (Dublin)

Live televised coverage
RTÉ, the national broadcaster in Ireland, provide the majority of the live television coverage of the football championship in the second year of a five-year deal running from 2017 until 2021. In the UK, Premier Sports have exclusive coverage of 26 games including Sunday provincial games from all 4 regions, 1st/2nd choice of qualifiers from rounds 1 and 2 and 4 of the 12 quarter-final group matches. Sky Sports broadcast a number of matches and have exclusive rights to a number of games including some All-Ireland super 8 matches. BBC Northern Ireland showed at least two live games from the Ulster Championship and other games were shown in their entirety at a later time.

Awards

The Sunday Game Team of the Year
The Sunday Game team of the year was picked on 2 September, the night of the final. Dublin's Ciarán Kilkenny was named as The Sunday Game player of the year.	

1. Stephen Cluxton (Dublin)
2. Jonny Cooper (Dublin)
3. Pádraig Hampsey (Tyrone)
4. Eoghan Bán Gallagher (Donegal)
5. Karl O'Connell (Monaghan)
6. James McCarthy (Dublin)
7. Jack McCaffrey (Dublin)
8. Brian Fenton (Dublin)
9. Colm Cavanagh (Tyrone)
10. Shane Walsh (Galway)
11. Ciarán Kilkenny (Dublin)
12. Brian Howard (Dublin)
13. Paul Mannion (Dublin)
14. Conor McManus (Monaghan)
15. David Clifford (Kerry)

All Star Team of the Year
The football All Stars were revealed on 1 November 2018 and were presented on 2 November at an awards ceremony at the Convention Centre in Dublin.	
		
1. Rory Beggan (Monaghan) 
2. Jonny Cooper (Dublin)
3. Colm Cavanagh (Tyrone)
4. Pádraig Hampsey (Tyrone)
5. Karl O'Connell (Monaghan)
6. James McCarthy (Dublin)
7. Jack McCaffrey (Dublin)
8. Brian Fenton (Dublin) 
9. Brian Howard (Dublin)
10. Paul Mannion (Dublin)
11. Ciarán Kilkenny (Dublin)
12. Ryan McHugh (Donegal)
13. David Clifford (Kerry)
14. Conor McManus (Monaghan)
15. Ian Burke (Galway)

Footballer of the Year
Brian Fenton (Dublin)

Young Footballer of the Year
David Clifford (Kerry)

References